Prista Oil is a Bulgarian company headquartered in the city of Rousse and mainly engaged in the production of 150 kinds of motor oils and industrial lubricants, as well as their distribution, transport and storage, cleaning petroleum pollution and the production and recycling of car batteries.

The company was established in 1993 by the brothers Atanas Bobokov and Plamen Bobokov. In 1998, it was joined by the Montana-based Monbat AD car battery factory. Prista Oil acquired the formerly national Seawater Purity Maintenance Enterprise based in Varna. Prista Oil produces Texaco and Valvoline-branded motor oils. The company has introduced an ISO 9001:2000 quality control system since 1998 and an ISO 14 001:1996 environment protection system since 2002.

Besides its Bulgarian operations, Prista Oil is also active in Romania, Hungary, Ukraine, Serbia, Montenegro and North Macedonia as a distributor and owns a production facility in İzmit, Turkey. The company has a terminal at the Ukrainian port of Odessa.

References

External links
 

Oil and gas companies of Bulgaria
Non-renewable resource companies established in 1993
Bulgarian companies established in 1993